JS Asagiri (DD-151) is an  of the Japan Maritime Self-Defense Force.

Development and design 
The Asagiri class is equipped for combat and interception missions, and is primarily armed with anti-ship weapons. They carries two of the Mk-141 Guided Missile Launching System (GMLS), which are anti-ship missile systems. The ship is also fitted to be used against submarines. She also carries the Mk-32 Surface Vessel Torpedo Tubes (SVTT), which can be used as an anti-submarine weapon. The ship has two of these systems abeam to starboard and to port. They are fitted with an Oto-Melara 62-caliber gun to be used against sea and air targets.

The ship can have up to 220 personnel on board. The ship is also fitted to accommodate for one aircraft. The ship's flight deck can be used to service a SH-60J9(K) Seahawk helicopter.

Construction and career 
She was laid down on 13 February 1985 and launched on 19 September 1986 by IHI Corporation, Tokyo. She was commissioned on 17 March 1988.

On 16 February 2005, she was reclassified to a training ship, the ship hull number changed to TV-3516, and it was transferred to the training fleet 1st training corps.

In 2008 and 2011, she participated in the practicing voyage to the ocean with the training ship JS Kashima.

On 14 March 2012, she was reclassified to an escort ship again, and the ship registration number was changed to DD-151 in the escort ship era. Reorganized into the 14th escort fleet of the escort fleet, the fixed port became Maizuru, and transferred to the same area.

Joint training with the Philippine Navy corvette  was held from 24–26 September. On 4 October, she returned to Maizuru after completing her mission off the coast of Somalia.

Gallery

References

External links 

Asagiri-class destroyers
Ships built by IHI Corporation
1986 ships